Ricardo Glenn (born May 1, 1990) is an American basketball player. Glenn plays the center position, and currently plays for Ciclista Olímpico in Argentina.

Professional career
In his debut season in Europe, he played with Hoverla Ivano-Frankivsk in Ukraine first, where he averaged 12.0 points per game. In 2015, he left for MAFC in Hungary. Here, he was the leading rebounder of the 2014–15 Hungarian League.

In October 2015, he signed with Landstede Basketbal in the Netherlands.

In August 2016, Glenn signed with Club Biguá in Uruguay.

Playing style
Glenn is known as a "strong player", with "good rebounding capabilities".

External links
Basketballleague.nl Profile
USC Upstate bio

References

1990 births
Living people
American expatriate basketball people in Argentina
American expatriate basketball people in Hungary
American expatriate basketball people in the Netherlands
American expatriate basketball people in Ukraine
American expatriate basketball people in Uruguay
American men's basketball players
Basketball players from Augusta, Georgia
BC Hoverla players
Centers (basketball)
Club Biguá de Villa Biarritz basketball players
Dutch Basketball League players
Landstede Hammers players
Peñarol de Mar del Plata basketball players
USC Upstate Spartans men's basketball players